Vinica pri Šmarjeti is a village in the Municipality of Šmarješke Toplice in southeastern Slovenia. It lies northeast of Šmarjeta. The area is part of the historical region of Lower Carniola. The municipality is now included in the Southeast Slovenia Statistical Region.

Name
The name of the settlement was changed from Vinica to Vinica pri Šmarjeti in 1955.

Church
The local church is dedicated to Saint Martin and belongs to the Parish of Šmarjeta. It is a medieval church that was restyled in the Baroque in 1742.

References

External links
Vinica pri Šmarjeti at Geopedia

Populated places in the Municipality of Šmarješke Toplice